Three Kings was a Czech resistance group from 1939 to 1942. Its members were Josef Mašín (murdered by SS Einsatzgruppen on the orders of Reinhard Heydrich in 1942), Václav Morávek (killed in action in 1942), and Josef Balabán (executed in 1941).

The group was established in 1939 when Nazi Germany annexed Czechoslovakia. Their most important task was upholding radio contact with František Moravec in Great Britain.

Czech resistance groups